Blackthorn Winter is a young adult mystery novel by Kathryn Reiss. The book was first published on January 1, 2006 through Harcourt Children's Books.

A sequel, Murder at Heatherstone Hall, was published in 2015.

Plot introduction

Juliana, a fifteen-year-old girl, moves with her mother to the artists' colony of Blackthorn, England from the United States while her parents are undergoing a separation. She begins to investigate a murder of one of the artists living at the colony.

Reception
Critical reception for Blackthorn Winter has been mixed to positive, and the book received reviews from the School Library Journal and Horn Book Guide. Kliatt gave Blackthorn Winter a positive review, stating that "YAs who like mysteries in atmospheric settings will enjoy this one." The Bulletin of the Center for Children's Books gave a more mixed review, as they felt that the book had too many elements at play that made what was an otherwise enjoyable read sluggish at points.

References

2006 American novels
American mystery novels
American young adult novels
Children's mystery novels